Fazlabad (also Romanized as Faẕlābād) is a village in Esfandan Rural District, in the Central District of Komijan County, Markazi Province, Iran. At the 2006 census, its population was 593, in 161 families.

References 

Populated places in Komijan County